Navy Yard, also known as Near Southeast, is a neighborhood on the Anacostia River in Southeast Washington, D.C. Navy Yard is bounded by Interstate 695 to the north and east, South Capitol Street to the west, and the Anacostia River to the south. Approximately half of its area (south of M Street, SE) is occupied by the Washington Navy Yard (including the Naval Historical Center), which gives the neighborhood its name. The neighborhood is located in D.C.'s Ward 6, currently represented by Charles Allen. It is served by the Navy Yard – Ballpark Metro station on the Green Line.

History
Historically, the Anacostia River was once a deep water channel with natural resources and home to the Nacotchtank Indians. In 1791 Pierre Charles L’Enfant designed the plan for Washington, D.C., and, recognizing the assets of the Anacostia River, located the city's new commercial center and wharfs there. In 1799 the Washington Navy Yard was established in the area. It was the nation's largest naval shipbuilding facility for several decades. Today the Washington Navy Yard is the U.S. Navy's longest continuously operated federal facility.

Navy Yard was Washington's earliest industrial neighborhood. One of the earliest industrial buildings was the eight-story brick Sugar House, built in Square 744 at the foot of New Jersey Avenue SE as a sugar refinery in 1797-98. In 1805, it became the Washington Brewery, which produced beer until it closed in 1836. The brewery site was just west of the Washington City Canal in what is now Parking Lot H/I in the block between Nationals Park and the historic DC Water pumping station.

The Navy Yard was a bustling nautical center during the 19th century and played an integral role in developing the area. The lively wharf was a hub for jobs, serving ships with lumber and raw materials for the growing city. It also played a key role in defending the city from the British during the War of 1812. Surrounding the wharves was an extensive commercial district, light industrial businesses, and one of the city's most significant neighborhood communities. As the city and nation evolved, the Navy Yard changed from shipbuilding to production of finished ship products and weapons ammunition.

However, during the 20th century, the river deteriorated due to pollution. After World War II, the Navy Yard consolidated its operations to a smaller campus, which slowed the economic and neighborhood activity of the area. Furthermore, around this same time, the elevated portion of Interstate 395 was completed, creating a physical barrier for access to the river. The confluence of these factors led the riverfront neighborhoods to become neglected and overrun with crime.

For many years, the neighborhood was home to eight LGBT bars and nightclubs that have since been displaced. Velvet Nation was a weekly dance event that took place at the nightclub Nation. The club, formerly known as The Capitol Ballroom, hosted musical acts such as The Ramones, Björk, David Bowie, Eminem, and Prince.

In 2013, the neighborhood was the site of the Washington Navy Yard shooting. In 2021, Navy Yard was subject to another shooting at Nationals Park, injuring three.

Redevelopment
Redevelopment of Near Southeast has been a goal of the government of the District of Columbia and business groups since the downsizing of the Navy's facilities in the early 1960s. The National Capital Planning Commission initiated several studies throughout the 1960s and 1970s that imagined considerably increased density along South Capitol Street and public parkland along the riverbank. None of these plans were implemented. Later, DC initiated a large redevelopment plan of the area between South Capitol, M, and 1st Streets and the Anacostia River. The Dravo Corporation won the community development contract and hired Charles I. Bryant to master plan a project, which they named "Capitol Gateway." The project failed in the early 1980s and led to industrial users and residents leaving the area. Subsequently, developers, the DC Government, and the Federal City Council envisioned redevelopment into the mid-1990s. None of these later plans were successful, but they set the pattern of development for the area that has followed.

Redevelopment began in earnest in the early 2000s, leading to the displacement of the industrial uses and adult-entertainment district. A major spur to redevelopment was a requirement of the Department of the Navy that contractors locate offices within a short distance of the Navy Yard. The construction of the U.S. Department of Transportation office complex and Nationals Park, the 2008 $600 million stadium of the Washington Nationals Major League Baseball team, have stimulated growth in the neighborhood. Most of the neighborhood's land and businesses have been purchased by companies and is currently being developed into commercial and residential projects.

Projects
Florida Rock is a  site that consists of  project in four buildings. It contains  of office space,  of retail,  of residential units, and a  hotel. There are two underground levels of parking with 1,087 spaces and green roofs and biofiltration systems. Construction started in the fall of 2009.
A new Frederick Douglass Memorial Bridge was constructed beginning in 2011. The bridge was shifted slightly to the south from its former location, terminating in a new traffic rotary called Potomac Circle at South Capitol, R, and Potomac Streets.
The Yards is a public-private partnership spanning ,  of office space, 2,800 residential units,  of retail space, and a  riverfront park. The first construction (400 residential units) began in 2007 and the entire project is to be completed in three phases over 10–20 years.

Building 170, a former electrical substation used by the Washington Navy Yard, is now owned by the USDoT.
Opening for the 2008 season, the new Nationals Park seats 41,000.
The Ballpark District will contain  of retail/restaurant space,  of office space,  (1570 to 2980 units) of residential space, and 7,000-8,000 parking spaces.
Arthur Capper/Carrollsburg is a  redevelopment of the Capper/Carrollsburg public housing project as mixed-income residential units. The 700 Capper public housing units will be replaced one-for-one. Adding to them will be another 700-plus market-rate and workforce-rate rental and ownership units. The first townhouses began construction in early 2008.
Capper Community Center is replacing the current one at 5th and K Streets. It will include a daycare facility for 66 children, a rec center, computer lab, gym, game room, and meeting/classrooms.
New Marine barracks have been built in the area and were opened in 2003. In 1999, the DC Housing Authority transferred to the Department of the Navy approximately six acres of the Arthur Capper Dwellings site at 7th and K Streets, SE, for the development of Bachelor Enlisted Quarters, parking, personnel support, and recreational facilities.
The Barracks Row historic commercial district along 8th Street SÉ has the greatest remaining concentration of historic structures in the Near Southeast. It provides a strong connection between Capitol Hill and the Navy Yard. Development of this area is in the beginning stages, but at least one property has been bought by developers for US$25 million and will be a new building containing  of office space.
Maritime Plaza is a new development on East M Street. The first two phases (Buildings 1 and 2) have already been completed. The first building contains  of office space, while the second houses contractors working with the navy. Phases 3 and 4 are each 175,000 square foot/7-story office buildings. There are also plans for a 250-room 8-story hotel at the southwestern edge of the property.
Washington Canal Park is named for the historic Washington Canal, which provided a water-borne connection between the Anacostia River and the Potomac River via the National Mall. Designers envision "trees, grass, plants, a splash pool, aquatic garden, and fountain. Officials say runoff from area buildings will be filtered and recycled and used in the water features."
Diamond Teague Park is a planned $16 million  public plaza (also referred to as the "First Street Plaza" or "First Street Landing") at the terminus of First Street envisioned as the principal "window" between the new baseball stadium and the river. It is expected to be constructed in phases in coordination with the redevelopment projects at Florida Rock.
Audi Field is the new home of the D.C. United MLS team, adjacent to Nationals Park.

See also
 Michael Shiner, 19th-century diarist and Navy Yard worker

References

External links

 ANC 6B ANC 6D, Navy Yard's Advisory Neighborhood Commissions
 "A Neighborhood's Evolution", news reports and interactive map, by The Washington Post
 JDLand, news reports and pictures of Navy Yard's urban renewal
 Capital Riverfront, Navy Yard's business improvement district

Neighborhoods in Southeast (Washington, D.C.)
Redeveloped ports and waterfronts in the United States